The 1975 Pot Black was a professional invitational snooker tournament, which took place between 28 and 31 December 1974 in the Pebble Mill Studios in Birmingham, and featured eight professional players. All matches were one-frame shoot-outs.

Broadcasts were on BBC2 and started at 19:50 on Saturday 4 January 1975. Alan Weeks presented the programme with Ted Lowe as commentator and Sydney Lee as referee.

Dennis Taylor made his debut in this year's tournament and went on to reach the final losing to defending champion Graham Miles 81-27, making him the third player in a row to win back to back titles after John Spencer and Eddie Charlton.

Main draw

Champions League

Challengers League

Knockout stage

References

Pot Black
1975 in snooker
1975 in English sport